Yushania elegans is a species of bamboo. It is found in India and Indo-China.

References

External links
 Yushania elegans at The Plant List
 Yushania elegans at the GrassBase, Royal Botanic Gardens, Kew

Bambusoideae
Plants described in 1989
Flora of India (region)